The doctrine of the lesser magistrate is a concept in Protestant thought. A lesser magistrate is a ruler such as a prince who is under a greater ruler such as an emperor. The doctrine of the lesser magistrate is a legal system explaining the exact circumstances that a lesser magistrate has the right and responsibility to resist the greater ruler.

The doctrine of the lesser magistrate is dependent on the private citizen argument from prior to the Reformation, which stated that any evil done by an officeholder is committed as a private citizen, rather than by the office.

The use of the doctrine of the lesser magistrates carried with it the possibility of violence and war.

Reformation
The doctrine of the lesser magistrate was first popularized in a simpler form by John Calvin, who wrote that private Christians must submit to the ruling authorities, but there may be "popular magistrates" who have "been appointed to curb the tyranny of kings". When these magistrates "connive at kings when they tyrannise and insult over the humbler of the people" they "fraudulently betray the liberty of the people" when God has appointed them guardians of that liberty.

A more elaborate doctrine of the lesser magistrate was first employed in the Lutheran Magdeburg Confession of 1550, which argued that the "subordinate powers" in a state, faced with the situation where the "supreme power" is working to destroy true religion, may go further than non-cooperation with the supreme power and assist the faithful to resist. This work drew heavily on Luther, including his Beerwolf concept as one of multiple conditions an evil ruler would need to fulfill before opposition to his rule could be justified. In other words, even though an evil ruler is acting as a private citizen, he still may not be resisted unless all of the other conditions are fulfilled. One of them was that the evil ruler must show himself to be a true Beerwolf and servant of the devil.

Variations on this doctrine of the lesser magistrate were commonly taught by orthodox Calvinists such as Theodore Beza. The doctrine of the lesser magistrate became important for the justification of the Dutch Revolt. According to Johannes Althusius in 1603 work, Politica, resistance to a supreme magistrate by lesser magistrates is justified in the case of tyranny. Althusius argued that the provincial authorities of the United Provinces were in this situation.

Gary M. Simpson suggests that after the St. Bartholomew's Day massacre in 1572 there was a "populist expansion" of the doctrine in which "the ruled would no longer be merely the subject of the ruler; they would become citizens."

Both the private citizen argument and the doctrine of the lesser magistrates were used in the United States Declaration of Independence to justify resistance by lesser leaders who in all other cases would be bound to submit to the top executive. Like Holy Roman Emperor Charles V, George III sent an army to terrorize his own subjects, fulfilling the Beerwolf clause.

Later developments of the concept
Following the spread of Hegelianism, the doctrine of the lesser magistrate became less important. This is because in Hegel's thought, authority within a society could bleed in at all levels, not just from the top executive down through a hierarchy, even though the philosopher noted that in matters of national importance, there must be a top executive to decide.

See also
 Resistance theory in the Early Modern period
 Monarchomachs
 Interposition
 Nullification (U.S. Constitution)

References

Political theories
Protestant theology